Quentin Thomas Brooks (September 4, 1920 – May 7, 2007) was an American sports shooter. He competed in the 50 m pistol event at the 1948 Summer Olympics.

Personal life
Brooks served in the United States Army during World War II.

References

1920 births
2007 deaths
American male sport shooters
Olympic shooters of the United States
Shooters at the 1948 Summer Olympics
People from McAlester, Oklahoma
Sportspeople from Oklahoma
United States Army personnel of World War II